The 1986 Meath Intermediate Football Championship is the 60th edition of the Meath GAA's premier club Gaelic football tournament for intermediate graded teams in County Meath, Ireland. The tournament consists of 18 teams. The championship starts with a group stage and then progresses to a knock out stage.

This was Ballinabrackey's return to the grade after a four-year absence as they were promoted from the J.F.C. after claiming the 1985 Meath Junior Football Championship title.

On 19 October 1986, Gaeil Colmcille marked their 20th anniversary with their 1st Intermediate championship title since being formed from the Drumbaragh Emmets and Kells Harps clubs in 1966, when they defeated Meath Hill 1–6 to 0–7 in the final at Kells. This ended their two-year absence from the S.F.C.

Team changes

The following teams have changed division since the 1985 championship season.

From I.F.C.
Promoted to S.F.C.
 Martry Harps  -  (Intermediate Champions)

Relegated to J.A.F.C.
 Moylagh

To I.F.C.
Regraded from S.F.C.
 Kilmainhamwood

Promoted from J.A.F.C.
 Ballinabrackey - (Junior 'A' Champions)

Group stage
There are 4 groups called Group A, B, C and D. The top two finishers in all groups will qualify for the quarter finals.

Group A

Round 1:
 Gaeil Colmcille 3-11, 1-1 Donaghmore, Walterstown, 11/5/1986,
 Ballinabrackey 0-7, 1-2 Dunsany, Trim, 11/5/1986,
 St. Colmcille's - Bye,

Round 2:
 St. Colmcille's 2-9, 1-4 Donaghmore, Bellewstown, 25/5/1986,
 Gaeil Colmcille 2-1, 0-2 Ballinabrackey, Trim, 22/6/1986,
 Dunsany - Bye,

Round 3:
 St. Colmcille's 2-10, 2-3 Ballinabrackey, Kilmessan, 13/7/1986,
 Gaeil Colmcille 2-9, 0-5 Dunsany, Skryne, 31/7/1986,
 Donaghmore - Bye,

Round 4:
 Gaeil Colmcille 1–8, 2-5 St. Colmcille's, Duleek, 10/8/1986,
 Dunsany 3-13, 0-5 Donaghmore, Skryne, 10/8/1986,
 Ballinabrackey - Bye,

Round 5:
 Ballinabrackey 1–9, 1-9 Donaghmore, Summerhill, 31/7/1986,
 St. Colmcille's w, l Dunsany, Duleek, 26/8/1986,
 Gaeil Colmcille - Bye,

Group B

Round 1:
 St. Michael's 2-10, 1-8 Oldcastle, Ballinlough, 11/5/1986,
 Dunderry 2-8, 0-7 Athboy, Trim, 11/5/1986,
 Dunshaughlin - Bye,

Round 2:
 Dunderry 0-9, 0-4 Oldcastle, Kells, 25/5/1986,
 Dunshaughlin 0-10, 0-9 St. Michael's, Kilberry, 25/5/1986,
 Athboy - Bye,

Round 3:
 Dunshaughlin 1-6, 0-8 Dunderry, Trim, 22/6/1986,
 Oldcastle 1-11, 2-5 Athboy, Kilskyre, 22/6/1986,
 St. Michael's - Bye,

Round 4:
 Athboy 3-7, 0-10 St. Michael's, Ballinlough, 13/7/1986,
 Oldcastle 1-8, 1-7 Dunshaughlin, Martry, 31/7/1986,
 Dunderry - Bye,

Round 5:
 Dunderry 1-9, 0-6 St. Michael's, Kells, 31/7/1986,
 Dunshaughlin 2-10, 1-12 Athboy, Summerhill, 10/8/1986,
 Oldcastle - Bye,

Group C

Round 1:
 Kilmainhamwood 0-7, 0-6 Rathkenny, Castletown, 10/5/1986,
 St. Mary's 2-9, 1-8 Ratoath, Duleek, 11/5/1986,

Round 2:
 St. Mary's 2-10, 0-3 Kilmainhamwood, Castletown, 25/5/1986,
 Rathkenny 2–4, 0-10 Ratoath, Seneschalstown, 21/6/1986,

Round 3:
 St. Mary's 2-11, 3-1 Rathkenny, Duleek, 13/7/1986,
 Kilmainhamwood 2-9, 2-3 Ratoath, Seneschalstown, 13/7/1986,

Group D

Round 1:
 Meath Hill 1-9, 2-5 Navan O'Mahonys 'B', Kells, 11/5/1986,
 Duleek 1–8, 2-5 Wolfe Tones, Rathkenny, 11/5/1986,

Round 2:
 Navan O'Mahonys 'B' 1-9, 1-5 Duleek, Skryne, 25/5/1986,
 Meath Hill 0-10, 0-3 Wolfe Tones, Syddan, 8/6/1986,

Round 3:
 Meath Hill 1-5, 0-6 Duleek, Kilberry, 22/6/1986,
 Navan O'Mahonys 'B' 1-8, 1-5 Wolfe Tones, Rathkenny, 28/6/1986,

Knock-out Stages

Finals
The teams in the quarter-finals are the top two finishers from each group.

Quarter Final:
 Gaeil Colmcille 2–5, 0-11 St. Mary's, Walterstown, 31/8/1986,
 Navan O'Mahonys 1-7, 1-4 Dunshaughlin, Athboy, 31/8/1986,
 St. Colmcille's 4-6, 0-4 Dunderry, Seneschalstown, 31/8/1986,
 Meath Hill 1-5, 0-7 Kilmainhamwood, Kells, 31/8/1986,

Quarter Final Replay:
 Gaeil Colmcille 2–10, 1-6 St. Mary's, Walterstown, 14/9/1986,Semi Final: Gaeil Colmcille 0–9, 1-6 Navan O'Mahonys 'B', Walterstown 28/9/1986,
 Meath Hill 1-10, 0-5 St. Colmcille's, Kells, 28/9/1986,
 Semi Final Replay: Gaeil Colmcille 0-7, 0-6 Navan O'Mahonys 'B', Trim, 5/10/1986,Final: Gaeil Colmcille 1-6''', 0-7 Meath Hill, Kells, 9/10/1986,

References

External links

Meath Intermediate Football Championship
Meath Intermediate Football Championship